Dijana Vidušin (born 12 February 1982) is a Croatian film, theatre and television actress. She won a Golden Arena for Best Actress at the Pula Film Festival.

Filmography

Television roles 
Luda kuća as Plamenka (2009)
Moja 3 zida as Dijana (2009)
Hitna 94 as Ela Radanjić (2008)
Zauvijek susjedi as Jana (2007)
Naša mala klinika as Vera (2005)

Movie roles 
Zagonetni dječak as Neda (2013)
Fuga y Misterio as Dora (2013)
Od danas do sutra as Jana (2012)
U jednoj zimskoj noći as Jasna (2012)
Koko and the Ghosts as Neda (2011)
Ljubavni život domobrana as Ines (2009)
U tišini as Ivana (2006)
Kao u lošem snu as Hannah (2002)

References

External links
 

Croatian film actresses
Croatian television actresses
1982 births
Living people
People from Pula
Golden Arena winners